

Events

Publications 
Lodovico Agostini –  (The Tears of the Sinner), fourth book for six voices, Op. 12 (Venice: Giacomo Vincenti & Ricciardo Amadino)
Felice Anerio – First book of canzonettas for four voices (Venice: Giacomo Vincenti & Ricciardo Amandino)
Giammateo Asola
Psalms (Venice: Ricciardo Amadino), also includes a Te Deum
 for four voices (Giacomo Vincenti & Ricciardo Amadino)
 for four voices (Venice: Giacomo Vincenti & Ricciardo Amadino)
Lodovico Balbi – Cappriccios for six voices (Venice: Angelo Gardano)
Giulio Belli – First book of masses for five voices (Venice: Angelo Gardano)
Camillo Cortellini – Third book of madrigals for five voices (Ferrara: Vittorio Baldini)
Jacobus Gallus – , volume 1 (Prague: Georg Nigrinus).
Ruggiero Giovannelli – First book of madrigals for five voices (Venice: Angelo Gardano)
Marc'Antonio Ingegneri
First book of motets for four voices (Venice: Angelo Gardano)
First book of madrigals for six voices (Venice: Angelo Gardano)
Simon Bar Jona Madelka – Seven Penitential Psalms for five voices (Altdorf: Nikolaus Knorr)
Jacques Mauduit –  for four voices (Paris: Le Roy & Ballard)
Philippe de Monte – Eleventh book of madrigals for five voices (Venice: Angelo Gardano)
Giovanni Maria Nanino
Motets for three and five voices (Venice: Angelo Gardano)
Third book of madrigals for five voices (Venice: Angelo Gardano)
Lucas Osiander the Elder –  (Fifty sacred songs and psalms) for four voices (Nuremberg: Katharina Gerlach)
Giovanni Pierluigi da Palestrina – Second book of madrigals for four voices
Nicola Parma – Sacrae cantiones..., book two (Venice: Giacomo Vincenti & Ricciardo Amadino)
Costanzo Porta – Fourth book of madrigals for five voices (Venice: Angelo Gardano)
Giaches de Wert – Eighth book of madrigals for five voices

Compositions
Anthony Holborne – The Countess of Pembroke's Funerals

Births 
January 20 – Johann Hermann Schein, German composer (died 1630)
July 1 – Claudio Saracini, lutenist, singer and composer (died 1630)
Probable
Andrea Falconieri, composer (died 1653)

Deaths 
August 27 – George de La Hèle, Franco-Flemish composer
November – Bernardino de Figueroa, composer (born c.1510)

 
Music
16th century in music
Music by year